Franz Rosei (born 2 July 1947 in Vienna) is an Austrian sculptor and draughtsman. His brother is the writer Peter Rosei.

Biography 
After completing high school in 1966, Franz Rosei started to work on wooden and gypsum sculptures. After a short stay at the University of Applied Arts of Vienna (Universität für angewandte Kunst – " die Angewandte "), where he followed lessons with Prof. Leinfellner, he worked independently again. He produced a few sculptures with the concrete casting technique. As from 1970 he worked primarily with stone (marble, limestone, sandstone) and with some drawings (pencil, charcoal, watercolor). In 1985 Rosei began working in bronze.

The works of Franz Rosei have been displayed for over 30 years in many exhibitions in Austria and abroad (Germany, United States, Italy, France and Switzerland).

Rosei's main topic is a vision on this life and world, and the wish to bring onto shape the outcome of such observation and such thinking.

Exhibitions

Individual exhibitions (selection) 
 Künstlerhaus, Vienna, 1976
 Galerie Schapira & Beck, Vienna, 1977
 Galerie Orny, Munich, 1978
 Künstlerhaus, Salzburg, 1979
 Künstlerhaus, Klagenfurt, 1979
 In the context of the "Sonderschau Österreich", 1980
 During the "Kunstmesse Basel" in the context of the "Biennale des Jeunes", Paris, 1980
 Künstlerhaus, Vienna, 1980
 Galerie Droschl, Graz, 1981
 Galerie Welz, Salzburg, 1982
 Galerie Würthle, Vienna, 1983
 Museum moderner Kunst/Museum des 20. Jahrhunderts, Vienna, 1984
 Galerie Lendl, Graz, 1989
 Galerie Ulysses, Vienna, 1989
 Salzburger Landessammlungen Rupertinum, Salzburg, 1990
 Ulysses Gallery, New York, 1991
 Galerie im Taxispalais, Innsbruck, 1994
 Galerie Ulysses, Vienna, 1995
 Kulturhaus Graz, 2000
 Historisches Museum der Stadt Wien, 2001
 Galerie Ulysses, Vienna, 2001
 Künstlerhaus, Klagenfurt, 2003
 Galerie Arthouse, Bregenz, 2004
 Galerie Ulysses, Vienna, 2007

Participation to exhibitions (selection) 

 " Steinzeit ", Tiroler Kunstpavillon, Innsbruck, 1986
 Museum moderner Kunst/Museum des 20. Jahrhunderts, Vienna, 1987
 " Wien – Vienna 1960–1990 ", Museum Moderner Kunst, Bolzano, 1989
 " Wien – Vienna 1960–1990 ", Palazzo della Permanente, Milan, 1990
 " Ursprung und Moderne ", Neue Galerie der Stadt Linz, Linz, 1990
 " La figura interiore ", Pordenone, 1991
 " Wotruba und die Folgen ", Museum Würth und BAWAG Foundation, Vienna, 1994
 " Skulpturengarten ", Galerie Poller, Frankfurt, 1996
 " Des Eisbergs Spitze ", Kunsthalle Wien, Vienna, 1998
 " Ein gemeinsamer Ort. Skulpturen, Plastiken, Objekte ", Lentos Museum Linz, 2006
 " Albrecht und Zeitgenossen, Positionen österreichischer Bildhauerei seit 1945 ", Künstlerhaus Bregenz, 2007

Works presented at official exhibitions
 Graphische Sammlung Albertina, Vienna
 Bundesministerium für Unterricht und Kunst (Artothek Wien)
 Salzburger Landessammlung Rupertinum, Salzburg
 Kulturamt der Stadt Wien
 Kulturamt der Stadt Linz
 Amt der niederösterreichischen Landesregierung
 Museum moderner Kunst, Vienna
 Lentos Kunstmuseum, Linz
 Wien Museum

Publications
 Franz Rosei / Ernst Nowak, Steine / Felder, Gemini-Verlag, Berlin, 2003, 65 pp., 
 Peter Rosei (texts) and Franz Rosei (drawings), Entwurf für eine Welt ohne Menschen, Entwurf zu einer Reise ohne Ziel, Residenz Verlag, Salzburg, 1975, 164 pp., 
 Peter Rosei and Franz Rosei, Ich glaube… in: Katalog Schapira & Beck, Vienna 1977
 Peter Rosei and Franz Rosei, Von der Arbeit…, in: Katalog Künstlerhaus Salzburg und Künstlerhaus Klagenfurt, 1979

Bibliography
 Peter Baum, Ursprung und Moderne, Neue Galerie der Stadt Linz, 1990
 Otto Breicha, Österreich zum Beispiel, Residenz Verlag, Salzburg, 1983
 Otto Breicha, Franz Rosei, in: Wotruba und die Folgen, Österreichische Plastik seit 1945, Salzburger Landessammlungen Rupertinum, 1994
 Herbert Fidler, Sichtbare Spuren, Trend / Profil Verlag, Vienna, 1994
 Ines Höllwarth, Franz Rosei, in: Figur als Aufgabe, Aspekte der österreichischen Plastik nach 1945, Skulpturen und Arbeiten auf Papier, Salzburger Landessammlungen Rupertinum, 1989
 Giancarlo Pauletto, Franz Rosei, in: La figura interiore, edizioni d'arte – serie quadrata 53, 1991
 Max Peintner, Commentaire, in: catalogue of the XIth Biennale de Paris, 1980
 Peter Rosei, Zu den Skulpturen Franz Roseis, in: Katalog Galerie Ulysses, Vienna, 2007
 Peter Rosei, Diskurs der Muster, Anmerkungen zu einigen Figuren Franz Roseis, in: Parnass, Heft 3, Linz 1990, as well as in: Katalog Salzburger Landessammlungen Rupertinum, 1990
 Dieter Ronte, Der Torso als Befragung des Menschen oder von der Ganzheitlichkeit des non-finito, in: Franz Rosei, Skulpturen und Zeichnungen, Schriftenreihe des Museums moderner Kunst, n° 22, Vienna, 1984
 Max Peintner, Über drei Skulpturen Roseis, in: Franz Rosei, Skulpturen und Zeichnungen, Schriftenreihe des Museums moderner Kunst, n° 22, Vienna, 1984
 Peter Weiermair, Das direkte Behauen ist der wahre Weg in der Bildhauerei…, in: Katalog Steinzeit, Innsbruck, 1986
 Kristian Sotriffer, Wien – Vienna 1960–1990, Nuove edizioni Gabriele Mazzotta, Milan, 1989
 Sàrolta Schredl, Aspekte und Situationen im Werk Franz Roseis, in: Katalog Galerie im Taxispalais, Innsbruck, 1994
 Peter Weiermair, Beschädigte Klassizität: zu den Arbeiten des Bildhauers Franz Rosei, in: Franz Rosei, Skulpturen 1970 bis 2000, Katalog Historisches Museum der Stadt Wien, 2001

References 

 Biennale de Paris : note on Franz Rosei
 Galerie Arthouse
 Basis Wien – Kunst, Information und Archiv
 Kunstnet Österreich – Galerie Ulysses
 Kunstverein Kärnten
 Wien Museum

1961 births
Living people
Austrian sculptors
Austrian male sculptors
20th-century sculptors
21st-century sculptors